The 59th Utah State Legislature was elected Tuesday, November 2, 2010 and convened on January 24, 2011.

Dates of sessions

2009 General Session: January 24, 2011 - March 10, 2011

Leadership

Leadership, 2011-2012 session

House of Representatives

Composition

Senate Makeup

Members

House of Representatives Makeup

Members

Employees/Staff
 Legislative Research Library and Information Center
 Office of Legislative Printing
 Office of the Legislative Auditor General
 Office of the Legislative Fiscal Analyst
 Office of Legislative Research and General Counsel

See also

 Government of Utah
 List of Utah State Legislatures
 Utah Transfer of Public Lands Act

External links
 Utah State Legislature
 2008 Election Results
 Office of the Governor

Legislature
59
2010s in Utah
2010 in Utah
2011 in Utah
2010 U.S. legislative sessions
2011 U.S. legislative sessions